The  Naval Staff Directorate is a military staff directorate created in 1985 as the Directorate of Naval Staff Duties. The directorate was originally part of the British Ministry of Defence (Navy Department) and is now under the Ministry of Defence (Naval Staff) as part of Navy Command. It is currently administered by the Commodore Naval Staff now based at MOD HQ.

History
The directorate was established in November 1985 when its chief responsibilities was to provide administrative support to both the Admiralty Board and the Navy Board. Oversight of the directorate was initially the responsibility of the Office of the Assistant Chief of the Naval Staff which is now the responsibility of the Office of the Assistant Chief of the Naval Staff (Policy) as part of Navy Command.

The directorate was administered by the Director of Naval Staff Duties from inception until June 2007 when his title was changed to Director of Naval Staff until 2014 when it was changed again to Commodore Naval Staff who in other official documents is sometimes styled as Head of Naval Staff. 

The Naval Staff Directorate is currently providing support to the First Sea Lord, ACNS (Policy), and the Navy Board. Circa 2014 the directorate was supported in its role by a Secretariat.

Heads of the Directorate
Included:

Director of Naval Staff Duties
 Captain Roger C. Dimmock: January-February 1985
 Captain E. S. Jeremy Larken: February-April 1985
 Captain the Hon. Nicholas J. Hill-Norton: April 1985-June 1987
 Captain Geoffrey W.R. Biggs: June 1987-August 1989
 Captain Michael C. Boyce: August 1989-April 1991
 Captain Michael P. Gretton: April 1991-July 1993
 Captain Alan W.J. West: July 1993-1994
 Commodore John H.S. McAnally: 1994-1995
 Commodore Christopher D. Stanford: 1995-1997
 Brigadier Robert A. Fry. RM: 1997-1999
 Commodore David G. Snelson: 1999-September 2000
 Commodore Trevor A. Soar: September 2000-August 2002
 Commodore Robert G. Cooling: August 2002-2003
 Commodore Michael Kimmons: 2003-February 2005
 Commodore Thomas A. Cunningham: February 2005-June 2007

Director of Naval Staff
 Brigadier Francis H.R. Howes. RM: June 2007-April 2008
 Commodore Clive C.C. Johnstone: April-December 2008
 Commodore Robert K. Tarrant: December 2008-August 2011
 Commodore Neil L. Brown: August 2011-November 2013
 Brigadier Peter S. Cameron. RM: November 2013-April 2014

Commodore Naval Staff
 Commodore James M. Lines: April 2014-February 2016
 Commodore Nicholas S. Roberts: February 2016-September 2017
 Commodore Iain S. Lower: September 2017-February 2020
 Commodore Paul S. Beattie February 2020-Present

Citations

Sources
 Howard, B. M. (1985). The Civil Service Yearbook: Cabinet Office. London, England: HM Stationery Office. .
 O'Donnell, Sir Gus (2007). The Civil Service Yearbook: Cabinet Office. Nowich, England: The Stationery Office Ltd. .
 Mackie, Colin (January 2019). "Royal Navy Senior Appointments from 1865" (PDF). gulabin.com. C. Mackie.
 "The Navy Directory (2017) Containing Lists of Ships, Establishments and Officers of the Fleet" (PDF). royalnavy.mod.uk. London, England: Ministry of Defence United Kingdom.

Naval Staff Directorates of the Ministry of Defence (United Kingdom)
Ministry of Defence Navy Department
Military units and formations established in 1985
1985 establishments in the United Kingdom